Nigerian Broadcasters Merit Awards are presented annually to recognize excellence of professionals in the African/Nigerian broadcast industry. The first edition of the awards was held on October 31, 2010. The pioneer award for the broadcasters was the idea of Omogbolahan Akinwumi, formerly known as Kazeem Popoola, the chief operating officer of the Reality Entertainment/Crystal Pearl Communications.

References

Broadcasting awards
Nigerian awards